Timeless is an American science fiction television series that premiered on NBC on October 3, 2016. It stars Abigail Spencer, Matt Lanter, and Malcolm Barrett as a team that attempts to stop a mysterious organization from changing the course of history through time travel. The series was created by Shawn Ryan and Eric Kripke, and also stars Sakina Jaffrey, Paterson Joseph, Claudia Doumit, and Goran Višnjić. The executive producers include John Davis and John Fox of The Blacklist.

Although NBC canceled the series after one season, the series was renewed three days later following negotiations with Sony Pictures Television. The ten-episode second season premiered on March 11, 2018, and ran until NBC canceled the series again in June 2018. One month later, NBC ordered a two-part finale to conclude the series, which aired on December 20, 2018.

Premise 
When Eastern European-based ex-National Security Agency asset turned terrorist Garcia Flynn and his group of terrorists steal an experimental time machine, Lucy Preston, a history professor, Wyatt Logan, a United States Army Delta Force Master Sergeant and Rufus Carlin, an engineer and programmer, are tasked with capturing Flynn. They soon learn that Flynn plans to rewrite history and that each of them has a connection to his plan as well as the mysterious organization known as Rittenhouse that funded the machine's development.

Cast and characters

Main 
 Abigail Spencer as Lucy Preston, a history professor and leader of the "Lifeboat" team
 Matt Lanter as Master Sergeant Wyatt Logan, a United States Army Delta Force officer and soldier of the "Lifeboat" team
 Malcolm Barrett as Rufus Carlin, a programmer and pilot of the "Lifeboat" team
 Paterson Joseph as Connor Mason, head of Mason Industries, creator of the "Lifeboat" and "Mothership" time machines
 Sakina Jaffrey as Denise Christopher, the Department of Homeland Security agent in charge of the "Lifeboat" team
 Claudia Doumit as Jiya Marri, a talented young programmer at Mason Industries.
 Goran Višnjić as Garcia Flynn, an Eastern European-based ex-National Security Agency asset turned terrorist whom the team chases when he steals the "Mothership"; he later joins the "Lifeboat" team to stop Rittenhouse.

Recurring 
 Matt Frewer as Anthony Bruhl (season 1), time travel project leader at Mason Industries
 Susanna Thompson as Carol Preston, Lucy's mother and a Rittenhouse member
 John Getz as Benjamin Cahill, Rittenhouse agent and Lucy's biological father
 Chad Rook as Karl (season 1), Flynn's henchman
 Annie Wersching as Emma Whitmore, former Mason Industries employee and Rittenhouse member
 Michael Rady as Nicholas Keynes (season 2), Rittenhouse leader from 1918
 Tonya Glanz as Jessica Logan (season 2), Wyatt's wife

Episodes

Season 1 (2016–17)

Season 2 (2018)

Finale (2018)

Production

Development 
Long considered one of NBC's hot pilots, it was ordered to series on May 13, 2016, after lengthy negotiations to obtain the series' "in-season stacking rights", which allow a network to stream all episodes of a series' current season via all the network's online platforms. On November 1, 2016, NBC ordered three additional episodes, increasing the first season order to 16. The season concluded on February 20, 2017.

Cancellation and reprieve
On May 10, 2017, NBC cancelled the series after one season. Three days later, following negotiations with Sony Pictures Television, NBC renewed the series for a ten-episode second season, which premiered on March 11, 2018. On June 22, 2018, NBC announced that the series had once again been cancelled, although the production of a possible two-hour movie finale to properly conclude the series was being discussed. On July 31, 2018, NBC announced it had ordered a two-part finale to properly conclude the series, which aired on December 20, 2018.

Lawsuit over concept 
Ryan, Kripke, Sony Pictures Entertainment and NBCUniversal were sued by Onza Entertainment for breach of contract and copyright infringement, claiming that the concept for Timeless was based on the Spanish series  (The Ministry of Time), which follows the adventures of a three-person team made up of two men and a woman who travel to the past with a view to preserving past events.

In April 2015, Javier Olivares, one of the creators of El Ministerio del Tiempo, met with representatives of Gersh in the MIPTV audiovisual fair of Cannes. There, they discussed the possibility of developing an American version of the show. Gersh would later ask for a DVD copy of the first episode of the Spanish show, with English subtitles. Onza Partners, the Spanish production company, gave that DVD to the Gersh Agency in the hopes of working with them. Roy Ashton, from the Gersh Agency, wrote to Onza letting them know that they liked El Ministerio del Tiempo and wanted to work with them. Ashton also mentioned Eric Kripke and Ben Edlund as possible show runners.

In August 2015, Deadline reported that NBC had bought a project called Time, created by Kripke and Shawn Ryan. At the same time, all negotiations regarding the American version of El Ministerio del Tiempo were dropped. That project went on to become Timeless, with its pilot episode airing in January 2016.

The defendants responded to the suit in a November 23, 2016 filing, contending that shows about time travel are an established television genre, and that similarities between the two shows are generic, and largely based on the notion that the main characters will travel in time to effect some kind of change. A request to dismiss Onza's lawsuit by Sony was denied on February 15, 2017, but the two parties ultimately came to an agreement and jointly moved to dismiss.

Release 
Season 1 aired on NBC in the U.S. and on Global in Canada on Monday nights at 10 p.m. Eastern and Pacific (9 p.m. Central). Season 2 aired on NBC and Global on Sunday nights at 10 pm. EST/PST. (9 p.m. CST). Episodes can also be streamed online through NBC and Global's respective websites, as well as on Netflix in some countries. Episodes can also be streamed on Hulu in the United States.  Starting from December 14, 2016, it aired in the UK on E4 every Wednesday at 9:00 pm. UK time. The series also aired in Japan on AXN.

Reception

Critical response 

The first season of Timeless received generally positive reviews from television critics. Review aggregation website Rotten Tomatoes gives the first season an approval rating of 83%, with an average rating of 6.39 out of 10 based on reviews by forty critics. The site's critical consensus states, "Timeless is a fun throwback action series with a kooky premise worth watching, even if it is delivered clumsily at times." The second season fared significantly better, receiving a 100% rating, with an average rating of 8.43 based on fourteen reviews. Metacritic, which uses a normalized rating, gave the first season a score of 65 out of 100, based on reviews from 29 critics, indicating "generally favorable reviews". A 90% approval rating for the finale was reported by Rotten Tomatoes, with an average rating of 8.83/10 based on 10 reviews, and a critical consensus reading, "A fitting farewell, Timeless wraps with a fun, festive finale that ties up loose ends and provides enough fan service to satisfy."

Ratings

Season 1

Season 2

Finale

Awards and nominations

Home media

References

External links 
 
 

2010s American drama television series
2010s American science fiction television series
2010s American time travel television series
2016 American television series debuts
2018 American television series endings
American action adventure television series
American fantasy television series
American television series revived after cancellation
NBC original programming
Television series about the history of the United States
Television series by Sony Pictures Television
Television series by Universal Television
Television shows filmed in Vancouver
Television shows set in San Francisco
Television shows involved in plagiarism controversies
Television series created by Eric Kripke
American fantasy drama television series
American alternate history works